Selwyn Huts, also called Upper Selwyn Huts, is a rural settlement close to the northern shore of Lake Ellesmere / Te Waihora in the Selwyn District of New Zealand. Lower Selwyn Huts is a smaller settlement 2.8 km further south.

The settlement consists of private dwellings on public land, and has existed since 1895. Residents pay an annual licensing fee for use of the land.

Lower Selwyn Huts was affected by flooding in 2021.

Demographics
It is part of the Irwell statistical area. 

7026938 had a population of 90 at the 2018 New Zealand census, an increase of 30 people (50.0%) since the 2013 census, and an increase of 9 people (11.1%) since the 2006 census. There were 57 households. There were 42 males and 48 females, giving a sex ratio of 0.88 males per female. The median age was 59.0 years (compared with 37.4 years nationally), with 9 people (10.0%) aged under 15 years, 6 (6.7%) aged 15 to 29, 51 (56.7%) aged 30 to 64, and 21 (23.3%) aged 65 or older.

Ethnicities were 93.3% European/Pākehā, 10.0% Māori, and 3.3% Pacific peoples (totals add to more than 100% since people could identify with multiple ethnicities).

Although some people objected to giving their religion, 43.3% had no religion, and 36.7% were Christian.

Of those at least 15 years old, 12 (14.8%) people had a bachelor or higher degree, and 18 (22.2%) people had no formal qualifications. The median income was $22,500, compared with $31,800 nationally. The employment status of those at least 15 was that 39 (48.1%) people were employed full-time, and 9 (11.1%) were part-time.

See also
Milford Huts

References

External links 
 Doyleston at the Selwyn District Council

Selwyn District
Populated places in Canterbury, New Zealand